Birboneh-ye Pain (also Romanized as Bīrboneh-ye Pā’īn and Bīr Boneh-ye Pā’īn; also known as Bīr Benah, Bīr Boneh, and Mīr Boneh) is a village in Kisom Rural District, in the Central District of Astaneh-ye Ashrafiyeh County, Gilan Province, Iran. At the 2006 census, its population was 145, in 46 families.

References 

Populated places in Astaneh-ye Ashrafiyeh County